The Hungaroring GP2 round was a GP2 Series race that ran from 2005 to 2016 on the Hungaroring track in Mogyoród, Hungary.

Winners

See also
 Hungarian Grand Prix
 Budapest Formula 2 round
 Budapest Formula 3 round
 Hungaroring GP3 round

References

GP2 Series rounds